2021–22 Liga 3 may refer to:
 2021–22 Liga 3 (Indonesia)
 2021–22 Liga 3 (Portugal)